Dainis Krištopāns (born 27 September 1990) is a Latvian handball player for Paris Saint-Germain and the Latvian national team.

He is one of the tallest handball players in the world with 215 cm. His weight is 135 kg.

He represented Latvia at the 2020 European Men's Handball Championship.

References

External links

Dajnis Kristopans profile
Profile at ehfcl.com

Latvian male handball players
1990 births
Living people
People from Ludza
Expatriate handball players
Latvian expatriate sportspeople in Belarus
Latvian expatriate sportspeople in Germany
Latvian expatriate sportspeople in North Macedonia
Latvian expatriate sportspeople in Qatar
Latvian expatriate sportspeople in Slovakia
Füchse Berlin Reinickendorf HBC players
RK Vardar players
Handball-Bundesliga players